Archil (died 6 October 1775) was a Georgian royal prince (batonishvili) of the Bagrationi dynasty of Imereti.

Prince Archil was a younger son of King Alexander V of Imereti by his wife, Tamar Abashidze and a brother of King Solomon I of Imereti. From 1769 to 1770, he commanded an Imeretian force against the Mingrelians around Khoni and, in July 1775, raided Atskuri in the Pashalik of Akhaltsikhe. In 1772 Archil married Princess Elene of Georgia, a daughter of King Heraclius II of Georgia. The marriage was political, forced upon Elene, who was in love with Prince Zakaria Andronikashvili. Archil died at Kaskhi in 1775.

Children 
Archil and Elene had three children: Barbare, David, and Mariam. By an unknown concubine, Archil also had a natural son, Mamuka.

Prince Mamuka (died 1840). He took part in an Imeretian revolt against the Russian rule in 1819 and then fled to Turkey.
Princess Barbare Bagration of Imereti (1771–1815), who was married to Prince David Tsulukidze.
Prince David (1772–1815), the last King of Imereti under the name of Solomon II (1789–1810).
Princess Mariam (1775–1854). She married, first, in 1795, Prince Melkisedek (Malkhaz) Andronikashvili (1773–1822) and had a son, Ivane, the future general in the Russian service. Mariam's second husband was Prince Leon Aleksandrovich Dadiani (1774–1847); they had no children.

References

1775 deaths
Georgian princes
Bagrationi dynasty of the Kingdom of Imereti
Year of birth unknown